The Cove Creek Tributary Bridge is a historic bridge in rural Logan County, Arkansas. It is a two-span closed-spandrel stone arch bridge, carrying Arkansas Highway 309 across a tributary of Cove Creek north of Corley in Ozark-St. Francis National Forest. Concrete barriers form the sides of the bridge on either side of the roadway. The bridge was built in 1936 under the auspices of the Arkansas Highway Commission.

The bridge was listed on the National Register of Historic Places in 1995.

See also
Cove Creek Bridge (Corley, Arkansas)
Cove Creek Bridge (Martinville, Arkansas)
Cove Lake Spillway Dam-Bridge
List of bridges documented by the Historic American Engineering Record in Arkansas
List of bridges on the National Register of Historic Places in Arkansas
National Register of Historic Places listings in Logan County, Arkansas

References

External links

Historic American Engineering Record in Arkansas
Road bridges on the National Register of Historic Places in Arkansas
National Register of Historic Places in Logan County, Arkansas
Bridges completed in 1936
Stone arch bridges in the United States
1936 establishments in Arkansas
Ozark–St. Francis National Forest
Transportation in Logan County, Arkansas